HappyTech is a collective that brings together all the innovative actors working around the well-being of professionals and employees.

Goal
This collective wishes to make France the country of well-being at work  and wishes to bring together the existing technological solutions in a toolbox for large companies.

This collective is open to all actors who bring a technological innovation around well-being at work.

References

French artist groups and collectives